Ashley Hall (also known as Ashley House) is a three-storey mansion in the Skippool area of Thornton, Lancashire, England. These include Danny La Rue, Joe Longthorne and Dorothy Squires.

Also in its grounds are two two-bedroom cottages (known as "The Housekeepers Cottage" and "The Gardeners Cottage"), a stable block and a Dutch barn. An annexe extension was built around 1980.

Built by T. B. Silcock, the property was owned by hotelier Len Rawcliffe from the 1970s until his death in 2021. It remains in the Rawcliffe family, but in 2022 it was put on the market for £3.75 million. Prior to that, it was owned by Mr and Mrs Percy Hawtin, who permitted the public to tour the grounds.

Ashley Hall stood across Skippool Road from another mansion, The Illawalla, which was demolished in 1996.

References

External links 

 Ashley Park - Parks and Gardens

Buildings and structures in the Borough of Wyre
The Fylde
Country houses in Lancashire